This is a list in alphabetical order of cricketers who have played for Middlesex County Cricket Club in top-class matches since the club was formally constituted in February 1864. Like the Middlesex county teams formed by earlier organisations from the early 18th century, the county club has always held first-class status.

It has also run a List A team since the beginning of limited overs cricket in 1963;, as well as a top-class Twenty20 team since the inauguration of the Twenty20 Cup in 2003. These are three separate categories.

The details are the player's usual name followed by the years in which he was active as a Middlesex player and then his name is given as it usually appears on match scorecards. Note that many players represented other top-class teams besides Middlesex and some players such as Nick Compton left the county but later returned. Current players are shown as active to the latest season in which they played for the club.

The list excludes Second XI and other players who did not play for the club's first team; and players whose first team appearances were in minor matches only.

Players who represented the county before 1864 are included if they also played for the county club but excluded if not. All players known to have represented the county before the formation of the county club are included in List of Middlesex county cricketers to 1863.

A

B

C

D

E

F

G

H

I
 Imran Tahir (2003) : Imran Tahir
 Eddie Ingram (1938–1949) : E. Ingram
 Anthony Ireland (2011–2012) : A. J. Ireland

J
 Kevan James (1980–1984) : K. D. James
 Malcolm Jardine (1890–1892) : M. R. Jardine
 Richard Johnson (1992–2007) : R. L. Johnson
 Arthur Johnston (1886–1887) : A. S. Johnston
 Craig Jones (2005) : C. M. P. Jones
 Ian Jones (2002) : I. Jones
 Keith Jones (1967–1974) : K. V. Jones
 Ed Joyce (1999–2009) : E. C. Joyce
 Peter Judge (1933–1934) : P. F. Judge
 George Jupp (1867–1868) : G. H. Jupp

K

L

M

N

O
 Iain O'Brien (2010) : I. E. O'Brien
 Tim O'Brien (1881–1898) : T. C. O'Brien
 Valentine O'Connor (1908–1909) : V. R. O'Connor
 Martin Olley (1988) : M. W. C. Olley
 George Osborn (1881) : G. N. Osborn
 David Osborne (1911) : D. R. Osborne
 Cuthbert Ottaway (1874–1876) : C. J. Ottaway
 David Ottley (1967) : D. G. Ottley
 Tuppy Owen-Smith (1935–1937) : H. G. O. Owen-Smith
 John Oxley (1883) : J. H. Oxley

P

R

S

T

U
 Geoffrey Udal (1932) : G. F. U. Udal
 Shaun Udal (2008–2010) : S. D. Udal

V
 Chaminda Vaas (2007) : W. P. U. J. C. Vaas
 Vintcent van der Bijl (1980–1981) : V. A. P. van der Bijl
 George Vassila (1880) : G. C. Vassila
 George Vernon (1878–1895) : G. F. Vernon
 Martin Vernon (1974–1976) : M. J. Vernon
 Adam Voges (2013–2017) : A. C. Voges
 Bert Vogler (1906) : A. E. E. Vogler

W

Y
 Umesh Yadav (2022) : U. T. Yadav
 Jack Young (1933–1956) : J. A. Young

References

Bibliography
 

Players

Middlesex